The Stokes radius or Stokes–Einstein radius of a solute is the radius of a hard sphere that diffuses at the same rate as that solute. Named after George Gabriel Stokes, it is closely related to solute mobility, factoring in not only size but also solvent effects. A smaller ion with stronger hydration, for example, may have a greater Stokes radius than a larger ion with weaker hydration. This is because the smaller ion drags a greater number of water molecules with it as it moves through the solution.

Stokes radius is sometimes used synonymously with effective hydrated radius in solution. Hydrodynamic radius, RH, can refer to the Stokes radius of a polymer or other macromolecule.

Spherical case
According to Stokes’ law, a perfect sphere traveling through a viscous liquid feels a drag force proportional to the frictional coefficient :

Because ionic mobility  is directly proportional to drift speed, it is inversely proportional to the frictional coefficient:

where  represents ionic charge in integer multiples of electron charges.

In 1905, Albert Einstein found the diffusion coefficient  of an ion to be proportional to its mobility constant:

This is known as the Einstein relation. Substituting in the frictional coefficient of a perfect sphere from Stokes’ law yields

In non-spherical systems, the frictional coefficient is determined by the size and shape of the species under consideration.

Research applications
Stokes radii are often determined experimentally by gel-permeation or gel-filtration chromatography. They are useful in characterizing biological species due to the size-dependence of processes like enzyme-substrate interaction and membrane diffusion. The Stokes radii of sediment, soil, and aerosol particles are considered in ecological measurements and models. They likewise play a role in the study of polymer and other macromolecular systems.

See also
 Born equation
 Capillary electrophoresis
 Dynamic light scattering
 Equivalent spherical diameter
 Einstein relation (kinetic theory)
 Ionic radius
 Ion transport number
 Molar conductivity

References 

Fluid dynamics